"The Cure For Pain" is the first single from singer/songwriter Jon Foreman's debut solo EP, Fall. It was released Monday, December 10, 2007 as a free download on popular networking site Myspace's homepage.

 confirmed it as a single.

Song story
About "The Cure For Pain," Foreman has said, "I wrote this one in Texas on a day off. I was reflecting on the passing of time. I have been playing music in Switchfoot for about ten years. During that period, I have been fighting pain or running away from it in a myriad of ways. And yet the pain is a constant. I have had some amazing moments singing gravity away but the water keeps on falling.
I began to think of the suffering I see around me, I think of the pain of a grandmother dying of cancer. Of a friend killed by a train. I think of the pain of death, of failure, of rejection, the pain of a father losing his only son. And I came to the conclusion that I cannot run from pain any longer."

In Pop Culture
This song appeared on the 17th episode of Season 4 of the TV show Grey's Anatomy.

References

External links 
 Jon Foreman Official Website
 Jon Foreman on Myspace
 Song Lyrics
 Song Story
 Download Song

2007 singles
Songs written by Jon Foreman
2007 songs